Apionichthys rosai is a species of sole in the family Achiridae. It was described by Robson Tamar da Costa Ramos in 2003. It is found in the Amazon River.

The species epithet "rosai" was given in honour of Ricardo de Sousa Rosa, a marine scientist at the Federal University of Paraíba in Brazil.

References

Pleuronectiformes
Taxa named by Robson Tamar da Costa Ramos
Fish described in 2003